This is a list of lighthouses in Coral Sea Islands.

Lighthouses

See also
List of lighthouses in Australia

References

Lighthouses in Coral Sea Islands
Lighthouses
Coral Sea Islands
Lighthouses, Coral Sea Islands